Wolfram Dorn (18 July 1924 – 17 June 2014) was a German politician of the Free Democratic Party (FDP) and former member of the German Bundestag.

Life 
From 1954 to 1961, from 1975 to 1980 and from 1985 to 1995 he was a member of the state parliament of North Rhine-Westphalia.

From 1961 to 1972 he was a member of the German Bundestag. From 1962 to 1968 he was chairman of the FDP parliamentary working group on domestic policy and from 1968 to 1969 deputy chairman of the FDP parliamentary group.

Dorn always entered the Bundestag via the North Rhine-Westphalia state list.

Literature

References

1924 births
2014 deaths
Members of the Bundestag for North Rhine-Westphalia
Members of the Bundestag 1969–1972
Members of the Bundestag 1965–1969
Members of the Bundestag 1961–1965
Members of the Bundestag for the Free Democratic Party (Germany)
Members of the Landtag of North Rhine-Westphalia
Parliamentary State Secretaries of Germany